Pinacol is a white solid organic compound. It is a diol that has hydroxyl groups (-OH) on vicinal carbon atoms.

Preparation
It may be produced by the pinacol coupling reaction from   
acetone:

Reactions
As a vicinal-diol, it can rearrange to pinacolone by the pinacol rearrangement, e.g. by heating with sulfuric acid:

Pinacol can be used with borane and boron trichloride to produce useful synthetic intermediates such as pinacolborane, bis(pinacolato)diboron, and pinacolchloroborane.

See also
 Semipinacol rearrangement

References

Alkanediols
Vicinal diols